Adolf Philipp, also known as Adolph Philipp (January 29, 1864 – July 30, 1936), was a successful Broadway composer, writer, lyricist, director, and performer. He used the pseudonyms Jean Briquet and Paul Hervé as well as his own name.

Biography
Adolf Philipp was born in Hamburg, Germany.  His early play, The Poor Nobleman, ran for a thousand nights in Vienna, Austria, and was performed in major cities throughout Germany. He emigrated to the United States in 1889 and became an American citizen on June 2, 1898. He developed an interest in portraying German-American life. After founding the Deutsch-Amerikanisches Theater in Berlin, which enjoyed only limited success from 1904 to 1907, he cultivated a more receptive audience in New York City for his string of musical comedies and plays from 1907 to 1934, and in 1912 he opened the Adolf Philipp Theatre in Manhattan on East Fifty-Seventh Street.

Adolf Philipp's frequent business partner was his brother, Paul Philipp, a Broadway producer and father of Robert Philipp, the noted American Impressionist painter, who in his earlier years performed on stage in Europe in Adolf's productions.

Works

Broadway and other theatrical works
 From Across the Pond (1907); libretto by Adolf Philipp and Mortimer M. Theise
 Two Islands (1907); music by Louis A. Hirsch, E. Ray Goetz, Harold Orlob; libretto by Adolf Philipp and Mortimer M. Theise
 Alma, Where Do You Live?, Lyrical Comedy in 3 acts (1909); music by Jean Briquet; book and lyrics by George V. Hobart; from the French of Paul Hervé and German Alma, wo wohnst du? of Adolf Philipp
 Teresa, Be Mine, Musical Play (1910); music by Jean Briquet; lyrics by Adolf Philipp; original German book Therese sei nicht böse by Paul Hervé
 Auction Pinochle (1912); music by Jean Briquet and Adolf Philipp; book and lyrics by Adolf Philipp; original French book Une Partie de cartes by Paul Hervé
 Adele, French Operetta in 3 acts (1913); music by Jean Briquet and Adolf Philipp; book and lyrics by Edward A. Paulton and Adolf Philipp; original French libretto by Paul Hervé
 The Midnight Girl, Musical Play (1914); music by Jean Briquet and Adolf Philipp; book and lyrics by Edward A. Paulton and Adolf Philipp; original German book Das Mitternacht Mädel by Paul Hervé
 The Girl Who Smiles, Musical Play (1915); music by Jean Briquet and Adolf Philipp; book by Adolf Philipp and Edward A. Paulton; original French libretto by Paul Hervé
 Two Is Company, Musical Comedy (1915); music by Jean Briquet and Adolf Philipp; book and lyrics by Adolf Philipp and Edward A. Paulton; original French libretto by Paul Hervé
 Kissing Time (1920); based on a libretto by Adolf Philipp and Edward A. Paulton
 Kultur (1933); written by Adolf Philipp
 Hotel Alimony (1934); written by A. W. Pezet from a farce by Adolf Philipp and Max Simon

Filmography
 Alma, Where Do You Live? (dir. Hal Clarendon, 1917)
 The Corner Grocer (dir. George Cowl, 1917)

References

External links

1864 births
1936 deaths
American theatre managers and producers
American theatre directors
American musical theatre directors
American musical theatre composers
American musical theatre lyricists
German theatre directors
German musical theatre directors
German emigrants to the United States
Broadway theatre producers
Broadway theatre directors
Broadway composers and lyricists
Musicians from Hamburg
Musicians from New York City
Songwriters from New York (state)